The Hilton Prague  is a hotel in Prague, in the Czech Republic.  It is located in the city center, near the Vltava River. The 11-floor hotel was built in 1989 and opened as the "Atrium Hotel Prague". It was designed by Czech architect Stanislav Franc. In 1991 Hilton took over the hotel. It has 791 rooms.

The hotel was awarded Best Hotel in the Czech Republic for 2012 and 2013 at the TTG Travel Awards.

The Hilton Prague is owned by Avid Asset Management. The hotel was put up for sale in November 2014.

The Hilton hotel brand has another property in Prague, the Hilton Prague Old Town.

References

External links
 Hilton Prague at Hilton.com

Prague
Hotels in Prague
Hotel buildings completed in 1989
Hotels established in 1989
1989 establishments in Czechoslovakia
20th-century architecture in the Czech Republic